George Yates (1843–1876) was an officer in the U.S. 7th Cavalry Regiment.

George Yates may also refer to:

George Edwin Yates (1871–1959), Australian politician
George Yates (Western Australian politician) (1908–1998), Australian politician
George Yates (Derbyshire cricketer) (1858–1933), cricketer
George Yates (Lancashire cricketer) (1856–1925), cricketer
George Yates (socialist) (fl. 1898–1904), British engineer and writer
 George Worthing Yates (1901–1975), American screenwriter